These are the official results of the men's 4 × 100 metres relay event at the 1996 Summer Olympics in Atlanta, Georgia. There were 37 nations competing. Canada won the gold medal with the United States claiming the silver and Brazil taking the bronze.

Medalists

* Athletes who participated in the heats and or semi final (but not the final) and received medals.

Results

Heats
Qualification: First 2 in each heat (Q) and the next 6 fastest (q) qualified to the semifinals.

Semifinals
Qualification: First 4 in each heat (Q) qualified directly to the final.

Final

See also
Women's 4 × 100 m Relay

References

External links
 Official Report
 Results

R
Relay foot races at the Olympics
Men's events at the 1996 Summer Olympics